Thrixspermum platystachys, commonly known as the starry hairseed, is an epiphytic or lithophytic orchid that forms untidy clumps with many tangled, wiry roots, up to ten stiff, leathery leaves and many star-shaped, cream-coloured flowers with an orange and white labellum. This orchid occurs from Papuasia to northern Queensland.

Description
Flowering occurs sporadically.

Taxonomy and naming
The starry hairseed was first formally described in 1886 by Frederick Bailey who gave it the name Sarcochilus platystachys and published the description in a supplement to A Synopsis of the Queensland Flora from a specimen collected by Thomas Bancroft near the Johnstone River. In 1911, Rudolf Schlechter changed the name to Thrixspermum platystachys. The specific epithet (platystachys) is derived from the ancient Greek words  meaning "broad" or "flat and  meaning "ear of grain".

Distribution and habitat
Thrixspermum platystachys grows on rainforest trees and on single trees near the coast in exposed situations. It occurs in New Guinea, the Solomon Islands, the Bismarck Archipelago and in Queensland on the Cape York Peninsula and as far south as Townsville.

References

platystachys
Orchids of Australia
Orchids of New Guinea
Plants described in 1886